Stonewall Bank, also, the Stonewall Bank Yelloweye Rockfish Conservation Areas (YRCA) is a bar, loosely southwest of Newport, Oregon, United States. Waldport and Yachats are also near. Locally, Stonewall Bank is known as the Rock Pile, has good fishing for salmon, black rockfish and flatfish.

It is split by a rocky channel, which was a seaward extension of the Yaquina River, when sea level was lower than today.

Inside Stonewall Bank

Inside Stonewall bank, it is illegal to fish for Pacific halibut, or any
species from the Groundfish Group, which includes lingcod, rockfish, greenling, Pacific cod, skates and flatfish. It is open, for fishing for salmon, steelhead—using authorized methods, during authorized seasons—tuna, and other offshore pelagic species of fish

Stonewall Bank has a buoy, which provides air pressure at sea level, air temperature, sea water temperature, waves, and winds.

Geology

Of geology, Stonewall Bank is the site of a growing, west-verging anticline which strikes north-northwest on the continental shelf, at 44.5° N, southwest of Newport, going eastward, to its onshore continuation, the Yaquina River.

On Stonewall Bank, a fault discovered in 2009 near southwest of Newport could produce an earthquake which compares in size to 1994's magnitude 6.7 quake that hit Northridge, California. The fault is a blind thrust fault.

See also

 Nehalem Bank
 Ocean bank
 Shoal

References

External links and references

General sites

 US government site, on Stonewall Bank
 A map
 Another map
 Fishing weather, in Stonewall Bank
 Information on the wave buoy at Stonewall Bank
 Information on Oregon areas, closed to fishing of West Coast Groundfish
 More information on the area, closed to recreational fishing of groundfish and halibut
 A Youtube video
 A Vimeo video

Geology

 A US government site, on the local fault
 More US government information on the fault

Undersea banks of the Pacific Ocean
Oregon Coast